The following Lists of Palestinians are lists of notable people with either a self-designation (endonym) or a foreign appellation (exonym) as "Palestinian", or who were born in the region of Palestine.

Approximately 12 million people today identify as Palestinians, as defined in the Palestinian National Charter of 1968.

Mandate period and after
The first list "Mandate period and after" consists of people who identify as "Palestinians" since the creation of Mandatory Palestine in 1920. The list does not include those Palestinian Jews or other Israeli citizens who are native to the geographic region of Palestine, unless they self-identify as "Palestinians".

Pre-Mandate
The second list "Pre-Mandate" consists of people with roots in the region of Palestine prior to the modern identity politics resulting from the creation of Mandatory Palestine and the Israeli–Palestinian conflict. As well as native Palestinian Muslims and Christians, the list includes those Jews, Samaritans, Druze, and Dom who were native to the geographic region of Palestine. The list also include some famous names and titles as exonyms, prior to nationalism and national identity becoming commonplace in the modern era.

Chronologically or by floruit and regnal succession:

References

External links 
 PASSIA: Palestine Personalities

 
Lists of Arabs